Inchmore (Tiernan) is a townland located on the island of Inchmore in Lough Ree in County Westmeath, Ireland. It is in the civil parish of Bunown.

The Townland is named after a local family that once inhabited the island. The island is split between two townlands, with the west being Inchmore.

References 

Townlands of County Westmeath